Ounianga Kebir may refer to
 Ounianga Kébir (town), Chad
 Lakes of Ounianga, Chad